El País is a national Uruguayan daily newspaper. It is based in the capital city of Montevideo and is regarded as the newspaper with the largest circulation in the country. It was first published on September 14, 1918 and previously belonged to the same media group as the television network Teledoce.

History
El País was founded on September 14, 1918. Founded by journalists Leonel Aguirre, Eduardo Rodríguez Larreta and Washington Beltrán Barbat, in 1919 Carlos Scheck joined the group. Originally, it was related to the National Party, precisely with the Independent National Party. However it later developed into a general interest newspaper.

For decades, El País has been among the leading written media in Uruguay, with a circulation of 65,000 on weekdays and 100,000 on Sundays. Its editorial focus is on the social, political and economic news of Uruguay, as well as the Mercosur regional trade alliance.

Awards 
From 1991 to 2012 El País had been awarding the prize "El País King of European Soccer" for the best footballer in Europe. 

The first winner was French Jean-Pierre Papin.                                    

Argentine legend Lionel Messi and French Zinedine Zidane were the record winners with 4 wins each. 

Messi won all four awards successively (2009-12).

Most wins by player

References

External links

 TV: canales de Montevideo concentran 95,5% del mercado - Portal 180, 10 November 2011
European Player and Team of the Year 1991-2006

Newspapers published in Uruguay
Spanish-language newspapers
Publications established in 1918
1918 establishments in Uruguay
Mass media in Montevideo
Spanish-language websites